The 1870 Caversham by-election was a by-election held  on 25 April 1870 in the  electorate in the Otago region of New Zealand during the 4th New Zealand Parliament.

The by-election was caused by the resignation of the incumbent Arthur John Burns, on 25 March 1870.

The by-election was won by James McIndoe. He was opposed by: William Cutten, John Graham and William Robertson.

Results

References 

 

Caversham 1870
1870 elections in New Zealand
April 1870 events
Politics of Otago